The federative units of Brazil are subnational entities with a certain degree of autonomy (self-government, self-regulation and self-collection) and endowed with their own government and constitution, which together form the Federative Republic of Brazil. There are 26 states and one federal district. The states are generally based on historical, conventional borders which have developed over time. The states are divided into municipalities, while the Federal District assumes the competences of both a state and a municipality.

Government

The government of each state of Brazil is divided into executive, legislative and judiciary branches.

The state executive branch is headed by a state governor and includes a vice governor, both elected by the citizens of the state. The governor appoints several secretaries of state (each one in charge of a given portfolio) and the state attorney-general.

The state legislative branch is the legislative assembly, a unicameral body composed of deputies elected by the citizens of the state.

The judiciary in each of the states is composed of judges of law, who constitute the courts of first instance, and a Court of Justice, which is the court of second instance of the state and is composed of judges called desembargadores. Judges qualify through exams or are appointed.

The states are divided into municipalities, which have different competences and are considered autonomous from the states. Municipalities have a mayor, vice mayor and a chamber of aldermen, all elected by the citizens of the municipality, but do not have a separate judiciary.

The Federal District has the same executive, legislative and judiciary organization as a state, but it cannot be divided into municipalities, which is why its territory is composed of several administrative regions. These regions are directly managed by the government of the Federal District, which exercises constitutional and legal powers that are equivalent to those of the states, as well as those of the municipalities, thus simultaneously assuming all the obligations arising from them.

Fernando de Noronha is not a municipality, but a state district of Pernambuco (the only state district in the country). It is governed by an administrator-general, appointed by the governor of Pernambuco, and a council whose members are elected by the citizens of the district.

All states and the Federal District are represented in the national congress, each with three senators and between eight and 70 deputies, depending on their population. The citizens of all states and the Federal District vote for these national representatives and for president and vice president.

History

The present states of Brazil trace their history directly to the captaincies established by Portugal following the Treaty of Tordesillas which divided the World between Portugal and Spain.

The first administrative divisions of Brazil were the hereditary captaincies (capitanias hereditárias), stretches of land granted by the Portuguese Crown to noblemen or merchants with a charter to colonize the land. The first such captaincy was the island of São João, granted in 1504 to Fernão de Loronha. The continental land was divided into captaincies in 1534, generally following lines of latitude, although some followed meridians or diagonal lines. Each of the holders of these captaincies was referred to as a captain donatary (capitão donatário). The captaincies were to be inherited by the holders' descendants, but the Crown retained the power to reacquire them.

In 1549, the Portuguese Crown appointed Tomé de Sousa as the first governor-general of the vast Portuguese dominion in South America, known as the State of Brazil (Estado do Brasil). In 1621, the northern part of the dominion was detached, becoming a separate entity known as the State of Maranhão. However, captaincies continued existing under both states as regional administrations.

During the Iberian Union (1580–1640), which allowed Portuguese settlers to enter Spanish domains, the territory of Portuguese colonial domains in South America was more than doubled, with both states of Brazil and Maranhão greatly expanding westward. After the union ended, Portugal asserted its territorial claims, which Spain eventually accepted with the Treaty of Madrid in 1750. Several captaincies were created or merged during this period, in both the original and western domains, and some were returned to the Crown, becoming royal captaincies.

The government of the Marquis of Pombal (1750–1777) significantly centralized the administration of the Portuguese colonies. By 1759, all captaincies had been returned to the Crown, with captains becoming appointed rather than recognized by inheritance. Some captaincies were designated as captaincies-general, to which other captaincies were subordinated. In addition, the State of Grão-Pará and Rio Negro and the State of Maranhão and Piauí, which had been split from the State of Maranhão, were reincorporated into the State of Brazil in 1775, under a single governor-general. This centralization later helped to keep Brazil as a unified nation-state, avoiding fragmentation similar to that of the Spanish domains.

The captaincies became provinces in 1821, during the final years of the Kingdom of Brazil (united with Portugal), and maintained that designation after independence in 1822 under the Empire of Brazil. Most internal boundaries were kept unchanged from the end of the colonial period, generally following natural features such as rivers and mountain ridges. Some changes were made to suit domestic politics (transferring the Triângulo Mineiro from Goiás to Minas Gerais, transferring the south bank of the São Francisco River from Pernambuco to Minas Gerais and later to Bahia, separating the capital city of Rio de Janeiro as a Neutral Municipality outside of any province, splitting Amazonas from Pará, and splitting Paraná from São Paulo), as well as international border adjustments resulting from diplomatic settlement of territorial disputes. The Cisplatine Province was annexed into Brazil in 1821, declared independence as Uruguay in 1825, and was recognized by the Treaty of Montevideo in 1828.

When Brazil became a republic in 1889, all provinces became states, and the Neutral Municipality became the Federal District. In 1903, Brazil acquired the territory of Acre from Bolivia with the Treaty of Petrópolis.

In 1942–1943, with the entrance of Brazil into World War II, the Vargas regime detached six strategic territories from the borders of the country in order to administer them directly: the archipelago of Fernando de Noronha (from Pernambuco), Amapá (from Pará), Rio Branco (from Amazonas), Guaporé (from Mato Grosso and Amazonas), Ponta Porã (from Mato Grosso) and Iguaçu (from Paraná and Santa Catarina). Shortly after the war, the Brazilian constitution of 1946 returned Ponta Porã and Iguaçu to their original states. Guaporé was renamed Rondônia in 1956, and Rio Branco was renamed Roraima in 1962, while remaining territories along with Amapá and Fernando de Noronha. Acre became a state in 1962.

In 1960, the rectangular-shaped Distrito Federal was carved out of Goiás to contain the new capital, Brasília. The previous federal district became the state of Guanabara, but in 1975 it was reincorporated into its original state of Rio de Janeiro, becoming its capital as the city of Rio de Janeiro.

In 1977, the southern part of Mato Grosso became the state of Mato Grosso do Sul. In 1981, Rondônia became a state. The Brazilian constitution of 1988 created the state of Tocantins from the northern portion of Goiás, established Amapá and Roraima as states, and returned the archipelago of Fernando de Noronha to Pernambuco. The constitution thus ended all remaining territories, although it maintained the possibility of creating others in the future.

Proposed division of Pará

On 11 December 2011, a consultative referendum was held in the state of Pará about creating two new states from parts of it (Tapajós and Carajás, with the rest of the state remaining as Pará). Both proposals were rejected by about 66% of statewide voters, but reflecting a strong geographic split with over 90% approval by voters in the proposed breakaway regions and over 90% disapproval by those in the rest of the state.

Maps

List 

Other statistics, by: highest point, literacy rate, life expectancy, infant mortality, murder rate.

Approximate correspondence between historical divisions

See also

Brazil socio-geographic division
List of Brazilian states by Human Development Index
List of Brazilian states by murder rate
List of Brazil state name etymologies
Provinces of Brazil
Regions of Brazil

References

External links
Economic statistical data for Brazil's 26 states and federal district (in English, Portuguese, and Spanish)

Map of Brazil, showing states and their standard time zones

 
Subdivisions of Brazil
States
States, Brazil